General Gwyn Jenkins,  is a senior Royal Marines officer, serving as Vice-Chief of the Defence Staff since August 2022. He was concurrently appointed Commandant General Royal Marines in November 2022.

Early life and education
Jenkins was educated at Malmesbury School. He graduated from the Military College Shrivenham in 2004, where he completed a master's degree in Defence Studies.

Military career
Jenkins was commissioned into the Royal Marines in 1990. He spent time as a junior officer in the Commando Logistics Regiment and on operations in Northern Ireland with 42 Commando.

Jenkins became commanding officer of his unit in 2009. He was promoted to colonel and deployed to Afghanistan in 2011 before becoming Military Assistant to the Prime Minister in 2012. He went on to become Deputy National Security Adviser for Conflict, Stability and Defence in 2016, commander 3 Commando Brigade in 2017, and Assistant Chief of the Naval Staff (Policy) in 2019. Jenkins was appointed a Companion of the Order of the Bath in the 2021 New Year Honours.

As a general

Jenkins was promoted to general on 30 August 2022, skipping the rank of lieutenant general, and took up the post of Vice-Chief of the Defence Staff. He is the first Royal Marine full general after Sir Gordon Messenger since 2016 and only the second since 1977. At the same time he was made an Aide-de-Camp (ADC) to the Queen. Jenkins also became Commandant General Royal Marines on 25 November, succeeding Lieutenant General Robert Magowan.

References

|-

Companions of the Order of the Bath
Living people
Officers of the Order of the British Empire
Royal Marines generals
Royal Navy personnel of the Iraq War
Royal Navy personnel of the War in Afghanistan (2001–2021)
Year of birth missing (living people)